Nan Dupin is a village in the Port-Salut commune in the Port-Salut Arrondissement, in the Sud department of Haiti.

See also
Berger
Ca Goulmie
Carpentier
Duclere
Laroux
Lebon
Nan Bois
Port-Salut
Praslin
Trouilla Verdun

References

Populated places in Sud (department)